Murder with Pictures is a 1936 American crime-mystery film based on a story by George Harmon Coxe. The film was directed by Charles Barton, the screenplay was written by Jack Moffitt and Sidney Salkow. Lew Ayres starred as Kent Murdock, Gail Patrick starred as Meg Archer; Paul Kelly and Benny Baker also appeared in the film. The film was released September 25, 1936.

Plot
After gangster Nate Girard (Onslow Stevens) is acquitted of the murder of Arch Cusick, his lawyer Stanley Redfield (Ernest Cossart) invites the press to a party at his apartment during which he is killed. At the party newspaper photographer Kent Murdock (Lew Ayres) meets Meg Archer (Gail Patrick) who later escapes to Ayres' apartment in the same building after Redfield is killed. The police suspect Archer is responsible for the murder, but are unable to find her, even though she is hiding in Murdock's shower. Later during the police investigation at Redfield's apartment Murdock finds fellow newspaperman's cap which has a photographic plate hidden inside which can identify the murderer.

Cast 
Lew Ayres as Kent Murdock
Gail Patrick as Meg Archer
Paul Kelly as I.B. McGoogin
Benny Baker as Phil Doane
Ernest Cossart as Stanley Redfield
Onslow Stevens as Nate Girard
Joyce Compton as Hester Boone
Anthony Nace as Joe Cusick
Joe Sawyer as Inspector Tom Bacon
Don Rowan as Siki
Frank Sheridan as Police Chief
Irving Bacon as Det. Keogh
Purnell Pratt as Editor

References

External links 
 
 
 
 
 

1936 films
1930s English-language films
American black-and-white films
American mystery films
1936 crime films
American crime films
1936 mystery films
Paramount Pictures films
Films directed by Charles Barton
1930s American films